Janette Husárová and Conchita Martínez were the defending champions, but Husárová did not compete this year. Martínez teamed up with Elena Likhovtseva and lost in quarterfinals to Daniela Hantuchová and Francesca Schiavone.

Virginia Ruano Pascual and Paola Suárez won the title by defeating Svetlana Kuznetsova and Alicia Molik 6–7(7–9), 6–2, 6–1 in the final.

Seeds

Draw

Draw

References
 ITF Tournament profile
 Main and Qualifying Draws (WTA)

2005 Dubai Tennis Championships
Dubai Tennis Championships